Christmas in Our Hearts is the seventh studio album and the first Christmas album by Filipino singer-songwriter and businessman Jose Mari Chan. It was released on November 17, 1990, by Universal Records. The album sold over 600,000 units in the Philippines in 2006, certifying Double Diamond by the Philippine Association of the Record Industry (PARI). It is considered to be the first OPM album to surpass the Diamond status. It is currently the biggest-selling album in the Philippines, selling more than 800,000 copies to date. Due to the recurring popularity of the song and album during the annual holiday season, Chan became known to Filipinos as "The Father of Philippine Christmas Music."

The album also features cover versions of "A Christmas Carol", "This Beautiful Day", and "Christmas Children" from the 1970 musical Scrooge.

The album has been re-released as a 25th Anniversary Edition on iTunes, Spotify, and Spinnr on October 30, 2015.

Background
According to Chan, the title track and first single of the album, "Christmas in Our Hearts", was originally an arrangement titled Ang Tubig Ay Buhay ("Water Is Life"), based on a poem written by Chari Cruz-Zarate. He took him two days to set the words to music, intending to make it a silver jubilee song for the Assumption High School Class of 1963. He described the poetry of Ang Tubig ay Buhay as very beautiful, which he found easy to compose a melody for.

Before production started, Chan had attended Mass at the Santuario de San Antonio Parish in Forbes Park, Makati; when a young lyricist named Rina Cañiza knocked on his car window. Cañiza would later replace the poem with the lyrics of "Christmas in Our Hearts" as we know it today, using Chan's melody for Ang Tubig ay Buhay. Chan also contributed some words to the song upon its submission, wherein his record producer, Bella Dy Tan, gave her opinion that the song was not going to sell because it was a Christian song. Chan then came up with the song, "A Perfect Christmas", which Tan said would be a hit. However, when Chan played both songs at a press conference, the media and DJs singled out "Christmas in Our Hearts" as their favorite. Tan was astonished to observe that the public loved the song. "Christmas in Our Hearts" eventually became a runaway hit and remains one of the most played songs in public places all over the Philippines.

Commercial performance
Christmas in Our Hearts is the best-selling album not only by Chan, but by an Original Pilipino Music (OPM) artist to date. Just weeks after the album was released, it was certified triple platinum by the Philippine Association of the Record Industry (PARI) in 1990. In December 2006, it was awarded with a Double Diamond certification by the PARI on GMA Network's SOP (Sobrang Okey Pare) for selling more than 600,000 units in the Philippines. It makes Chan the only Filipino artist to achieve the feat, with two Double Diamond albums—the other one being Constant Change. It makes the album the best-selling OPM Christmas album of all time. In addition, it always tops album charts during Christmas season. The album has sold over 800,000 copies in the country to date.

25th Anniversary Edition
In celebration of the album's 25th anniversary, Universal Records announced on their Facebook page that Christmas in Our Hearts is to be re-released in a special 25th Anniversary Edition. It was first released online on iTunes, Spotify and Spinnr on October 30, 2015, and was released on CD on November 11, 2015.

Track listing
All tracks were produced by Jose Mari Chan.
"A Wish on Christmas Night" (Chan, Pinky Valdez)
"Do You Hear What I Hear?" (Gloria Shayne, Noël Regney)
"Mary's Boy Child" (Jester Hairston)
"Christmas in Our Hearts" (with Liza Chan) (Chan, Rina Cañiza)
"A Christmas Carol" (featuring the Ateneo Glee Club) (Leslie Bricusse)
"A Perfect Christmas" (Chan)
"Give Me Your Heart for Christmas" (Robert Goodman)
"This Beautiful Day"—Jaymie Magtoto (Bricusse)
"The Sound of Life" (Chan, Valdez)
"Christmas Children" (Bricusse)
"Little Christmas Tree" (Mickey Rooney)
"When a Child Is Born" (Ciro Dammicco, Fred Jay)
"It Is the Lord!" (Chan, Maria Christina Ansaldo Estrada)
"The Lord's Prayer" (Traditional)
"Count Your Blessings (Instead of Sheep)" (Irving Berlin)
"May the Good Lord Bless and Keep You" (Meredith Willson)

25th Anniversary Edition bonus track
"The Sound of Life (Instrumental)" (Louie Ocampo, Chan, Valdez)
"Christmas Past" (Chan, Ocampo)

Personnel
Credits were taken from Titik Pilipino.

Production
Dindo Aldaecoa - sound engineer
Aperture 32, Inc. - album concept and design
Jose Mari Chan - vocals, album producer
Homer Flores - arranger
Rey Magtoto - arranger
Eddie Munji - arranger
Emy Munji - arranger
Willy Munji - MIDI programming
Willy Munji - sound engineer
Alvin Nunez - arranger
Louie Ocampo - arranger
Jun Orenza - sound engineer
Voltaire Orpiano - sound engineer
Monching Payumo - sound engineer
Marvin Querido - arranger
Ruben Remperas - sound engineer
Jun Reyes - sound engineer
Teddy Tan - photography

Recording locations
Ad & Ad Recording Studio
Audio Captain Recording Studio
Greenhills Sound
Cinema Audio, Inc.
JR Music Recording Studios

Certifications

See also
List of best-selling albums in the Philippines

References

External links
Christmas in Our Hearts on Titik Pilipino

1990 Christmas albums
Christmas albums by Filipino artists
Jose Mari Chan albums
Pop Christmas albums